Afraflacilla elegans is a species of spider in the family Salticidae. It is found in Zimbabwe and South Africa. Both the female and the male were first described in 2008, but the species initially placed in the genus Pseudicius, being moved to Afraflacilla in 2017.

References 

Salticidae
Arthropods of Zimbabwe
Spiders of South Africa
Spiders described in 2008